Abenezra is a lunar impact crater located in the rugged highlands in the south-central section of the Moon. Abenezra is named after the Sephardic Jewish sage, poet, biblical commentator, astronomer, and astrologer Abraham ibn Ezra. It is attached along the southeast rim to the crater Azophi. To the northeast lies the crater Geber, and further to the southeast is the larger Sacrobosco.

The rim of Abenezra has a noticeably polygonal shape, with uneven wall segments. The inner walls are terraced, and the floor is irregular and ridged. These ridges form unusual, sinuous patterns across the floor. The crater overlays the eastern part of another crater-like formation designated Abenezra C.

Satellite craters

By convention these features are identified on lunar maps by placing the letter on the side of the crater midpoint that is closest to Abenezra.

References

External links

Abenezra at The Moon Wiki
 

Impact craters on the Moon